Tim Matheson (born Timothy Lewis Matthieson; December 31, 1947) is an American actor. Some of his best-known acting roles include the title character of the 1960s animated Jonny Quest TV series, Eric "Otter" Stratton in the 1978 comedy film National Lampoon's Animal House, and the recurring role of Vice President John Hoynes in the 2000s NBC drama The West Wing, which earned him two Primetime Emmy Award nominations for Outstanding Guest Actor in a Drama Series. As of 2022, he is one of two surviving main cast members from Bonanza, next to Mitch Vogel.

Early life
Matheson was born in Glendale, California, a suburb of Los Angeles, Matheson was the son of Sally and Clifford Matthieson, a training pilot. He served a tour of duty in the United States Marine Corps Reserve.

Career
At age 13, Matheson appeared as Roddy Miller in Robert Young's CBS nostalgia comedy series Window on Main Street during the 1961–1962 television season. In the 1962–1963 season he appeared in two episodes of Leave It to Beaver, cast as Mike Harmon, a friend of Beaver’s. In 1964, he provided the voice of the lead character in the animated series Jonny Quest. He also supplied the voices of Sinbad Jr. the Sailor in the 1960s Hanna-Barbera animated series Sinbad Jr. and his Magic Belt and Jace in the original animated series Space Ghost. He co-starred as Joe Hardy, opposite Richard Gates as Frank Hardy, in a 1967 pilot episode for what would have been a TV series called The Hardy Boys, based on the novel series of the same name, but the series was not picked up.

He played the role of the oldest son, Mike Beardsley, in the film Yours, Mine and Ours (1968), which starred Lucille Ball and Henry Fonda.

In 1969, Matheson joined the cast of NBC's television western The Virginian in the eighth season as Jim Horn. He had a guest role in the 14th episode of the second season of Night Gallery, in the story "Logoda's Heads". In the final season of the television western Bonanza in 1972–1973, Matheson played Griff King, a parolee who tries to reform his life as a worker at the Ponderosa Ranch under Ben Cartwright's tutelage. He portrayed a corrupt motorcycle cop, Phil Sweet, who was part of a death squad with some other young cops in the film Magnum Force (1973). Matheson also appeared earlier in the CBS situation comedy My Three Sons. In 1975, he guest starred in CBS's short-lived family drama Three for the Road.

In 1976, Matheson appeared with Kurt Russell in the 15-episode NBC series The Quest, the story of two young men in the American West seeking the whereabouts of their sister, a captive of the Cheyenne. In 1978, he was part of the ensemble cast of National Lampoon's Animal House. The following year, he appeared with John Belushi again in Steven Spielberg's 1941. In 1980 he auditioned for the role of Indiana Jones in Raiders of the Lost Ark, for which Harrison Ford won the part.

Matheson appeared in the film To Be or Not to Be (1983) starring Mel Brooks and Anne Bancroft. He and Catherine Hicks played Rick and Amanda Tucker, who operate a detective agency in Laurel Canyon in CBS' Tucker's Witch, which aired during the 1982–1983 season. Then Matheson starred in the comedy films Up the Creek (1984) and Fletch (1985). In 1989, he starred in the short-lived sitcom Nikki and Alexander produced by Reinhold Weege.

Along with business partner Dan Grodnik, he bought National Lampoon in 1989, selling it in 1991.

He had a recurring role as Vice President John Hoynes on The West Wing. His work on The West Wing earned him two Primetime Emmy award nominations. 

He has directed episodes of Third Watch, Ed, The Twilight Zone, Cold Case, Without a Trace, The West Wing, Psych, The Good Guys, Shark, White Collar, Criminal Minds, Suits and Burn Notice (on which he also performed in a recurring role).

In 1996, Matheson took on the role of a con man who claims to be Carol Brady's thought-to-be-dead husband in A Very Brady Sequel. He appeared in the film Van Wilder (2002), playing the father of the title character, who was inspired by his own character in Animal House; Matheson's character even makes a veiled reference to the fun times he had had at Dartmouth, where the fraternity upon which Animal House is rumored to have "had a strong tradition of existence". He appeared in the auto-racing film Redline. He also appeared in a Volkswagen commercial in 2008.

In 2009, Matheson directed the pilot episode of Covert Affairs, premiered on USA Network in 2010. Matheson also directed the pilot episodes of The Good Guys (2010) for the Fox Network, Criminal Behavior (2011) for Lifetime, and Wild Card (2011) for USA Network. He played Dr. Brick Breeland on Hart of Dixie from 2011 to 2015. Since 2019, Matheson has starred as Doc Mullins in the Netflix series Virgin River.

Personal life
Matheson has been married three times. He was first married to actress Jennifer Leak from 1968 to 1971, whom he met on the set of Yours, Mine, and Ours. In 1985 he married Megan Murphy, with whom he had three children; they divorced in 2010. He married Elizabeth Marighetto in March 2018; the two live together in Hollywood, California.

Filmography

Film

Television

Theme parks

As director

References

Further reading
Kevin Scott Collier. Jonny, Sinbad Jr. & Me. CreateSpace Independent Publishing Platform, 2017.

External links

Interview with Tim Matheson @ A.V. Club

1947 births
Living people
American male child actors
American male film actors
American male television actors
American male voice actors
American television directors
Hanna-Barbera people
Male actors from Glendale, California
Film directors from California
20th-century American male actors
21st-century American male actors